Geodeung of Gaya, also called Geodeung Wang, was the king of Gaya, a confederacy of chiefdoms that existed in the Nakdong River valley of Korea during the Three Kingdoms era, from 199 to 259. Legend holds that he was the son of King Suro of Gaya and Suro's queen, Heo Hwang-ok. Legend says also they had in total ten sons. Geodeung Wang was married with Queen Mojong, who was the daughter of Sin Po Ch'onpukyong(泉府卿) and Mojong. Sin Po was a courtier in Heo Hwang-ok's entourage.

Family
Father: King Suro (수로왕, 首露王)
Mother: Heo Hwang-ok (허황옥, 許黃玉)
Wife: Lady Mojeong (모정부인, 慕貞夫人) – daughter of Sin Po (신보, 申輔).
Son: King Mapum (마품왕, 馬品王)

References

See also 
 List of monarchs of Korea
 History of Korea
 Three Kingdoms of Korea

Gaya rulers
259 deaths
3rd-century monarchs in Asia
2nd-century monarchs in Asia
Year of birth unknown